The Wainwright Sisters are a singer-songwriter duo featuring the Canadian-American Martha Wainwright and her American half-sister Lucy Wainwright Roche. In November 2015 they released the album Songs in the Dark, which includes a number of lullabies.

References 

American indie folk groups
Canadian indie folk groups
Family musical groups
McGarrigle-Wainwright-Roche family
PIAS Recordings artists